Hakim Ouansafi is a volunteer Chairman for the Muslim Association of Hawaii. He is also a volunteer board member for the Hawaii chapter of the federal law enforcement foundation and is a civil service commissioner with the City & County of Honolulu.

Ouansafi is the executive director of the State of Hawaii Housing Authority.

See also 

 Islam Day in Hawaii
 Islam in Hawaii

References 

Moroccan emigrants to the United States